Zhu Minyuan is a Chinese sprint canoer. She has competed since the mid-2000s, and won a silver medal in the K-2 1000 m event at the 2006 ICF Canoe Sprint World Championships in Szeged.

References

Chinese female canoeists
Living people
Year of birth missing (living people)
Asian Games medalists in canoeing
ICF Canoe Sprint World Championships medalists in kayak
Canoeists at the 2006 Asian Games
Medalists at the 2006 Asian Games
Asian Games gold medalists for China